Iraq participated in the 2010 Summer Youth Olympics in Singapore.

The Iraqi squad consisted of five athletes competing in four sports: aquatics (swimming), fencing, weightlifting and wrestling.

Fencing

Swimming

Weightlifting

Wrestling

Greco-Roman

References

2010 in Iraqi sport
Nations at the 2010 Summer Youth Olympics
Iraq at the Youth Olympics